Age of Ignorance is the third album by the New Hampshire-based band Our Last Night. It was released on Epitaph Records on August 21, 2012. A deluxe edition of the album was released on Itunes on June 14, 2013 that included three additional songs: Fate (Acoustic), Reason to Love (Acoustic), and Skyfall.

Track listing

Personnel
Our Last Night
 Trevor Wentworth - lead vocals, additional guitar
 Matt Wentworth - clean vocals, guitar
 Alex "Woody" Woodrow - bass
 Tim Molloy - drums

Production
 David Bendeth - producer

References

2012 albums
Epitaph Records albums
Our Last Night albums